Joseph Philippe Lemercier Laroche (26 May 1886 – 15 April 1912) was a Haitian engineer.

He put his pregnant French wife and their two daughters onto a lifeboat; they survived, but he did not. Joseph's daughter, Louise Laroche (2 July 1910 – 28 January 1998) was one of the last remaining survivors of the sinking of RMS Titanic.

LaRoche, a three-act opera by Atlanta composer Sharon J. Willis, is based on his life and was part of the 2003 National Black Arts Festival, premiering at the Callanwolde Fine Arts Center on July 18 of that year.

Early life
Joseph was born in Cap-Haïtien, Haiti. At the age of 15, Joseph was sent to Beauvais, France to study. After graduating with an engineering degree, he married a French woman named Juliette Lafargue. Due to the racial discrimination of the times, however, he had difficulty finding work. Tired of living off his wine seller father-in-law, he decided to return to Haiti with his growing family. His uncle, Cincinnatus Leconte, the President of Haiti, arranged a job for him as a math teacher.

Simonne Marie Anne Andrée Laroche was born in Paris, France, 1909; followed by her sister, Louise Laroche, born on 2 July 1910.

Voyage
The family planned to leave France in late 1912, but Juliette discovered she was pregnant for a third time, and Joseph decided to hasten their travel arrangements so the child could be born in Haiti.

Joseph's mother purchased first class passage for the family aboard the liner . The Laroches learned of the French Line's policy stipulating that children were required to remain in the nursery and were not permitted to dine with their parents. Disapproving of this policy, they exchanged their tickets for a second-class passage aboard .

Titanic was too large for the harbor at Cherbourg, France, and White Star Line tenders transported the passengers boarding from Cherbourg out to the ship aboard . The family boarded as second-class passengers on April 10, 1912.

Shortly after Titanic struck the iceberg at 11:40 p.m. on April 14, Joseph woke Juliette and told her that the ship had suffered an accident. He put all of their valuables in his pockets, and he and his wife carried each of their sleeping daughters to the ship's top deck. It is not known for sure which lifeboat Juliette and her daughters boarded, although Juliette remembered a countess being in her lifeboat. There was a countess, Noël Leslie, Countess of Rothes, on board the ship who escaped in lifeboat 8, so it is likely that Juliette, Simonne and Louise all escaped aboard this lifeboat or may had been lifeboat 14. Although Joseph died in the sinking of Titanic, his body was never recovered.

The two young sisters were hauled up to the deck in burlap bags. On board Carpathia, Juliette found it very hard to get linens which she could use as diapers for her children. Since there were none to spare, Juliette improvised and at the end of each meal she would sit on napkins, conceal them and make diapers out of them after returning to the cabin. Carpathia arrived in New York City, New York on April 18. Since there was no one to meet Juliette and her daughters, Juliette decided not to continue to Haiti. Instead, she returned to her family in Villejuif, France. The family arrived the next month, and it was there that Juliette gave birth to her son. She named her son, Joseph, in honor of his late father.

Aftermath
In March 1995, Joseph's daughter Louise stepped aboard Nomadic for the first time since 1912 when it carried her family to Titanic from Cherbourg, France. She was joined by fellow Titanic survivor Millvina Dean. That same year, Louise was present as the Titanic Historical Society dedicated a stone marker in Cherbourg commemorating Titanic passengers who sailed from its port.

Louise Laroche died on 28 January 1998 at the age of 87. At the time of her death only six Titanic survivors remained.

References

External links
 Louise Laroche at Titanic1.org
 Miss Louise Laroche at Encyclopedia Titanica

Deaths on the RMS Titanic
1886 births
1912 deaths
Haitian emigrants to France
French people of Haitian descent
Joseph Philippe Lemercier
People from Cap-Haïtien
19th-century Haitian people
20th-century Haitian people